e-Types is a brand agency based in Copenhagen. It employs 50 designers, strategists and account managers. Since 2006 e-Types has been subject to academic research by scholars from Copenhagen Business School and Harvard Business School.

History 
e-Types was founded in Vesterbro, Copenhagen, in 1997 by a team of young graphic designers. Over the past decade e-Types has developed from a business of five employees into a consultancy of 50 strategists, designers and account managers. In 2010 e-Types became part of e-Types Group.

The company's branding work includes Danish Film Institute (1999), Aquascutum (2002), Rzeczpospolita (2004), Royal Danish Theatre (2005), 3XN (2007), CPH:PIX (2008), DI (2008), Tryg (2010), Berlingske (2011), Sanoma (2013).

Academia 
By 2006, e-Types became an object of interest to scholars in the creative businesses academia. The cooperation with Learning Lab Denmark turned into an industrial PhD from The Danish School of Education (now University of Aarhus) using e-Types as the primary case of the research. The focus was "Conscious Design Practice as a Strategic Tool". Meanwhile, Professor Robert Austin from Harvard Business School made a different case-study concerning Innovation Strategy of a Design Firm.  The case-study was discussed and criticised at the 2006 Seattle Innovation Symposium at the University of Washington.

References

External links 

Branding companies
Design companies of Denmark
Design companies based in Copenhagen
Design companies established in 1997
Danish companies established in 1997
Companies based in Copenhagen Municipality
Danish design
Communication design